The Tauihi Basketball Aotearoa is a women's semi-professional basketball league in New Zealand.

History
In December 2021, a new women's national basketball league was established for 2022 with five new franchises. The league's name Tauihi Basketball Aotearoa was announced in March 2022, with Tauihi meaning "to soar" and Aotearoa meaning New Zealand in Māori language. The inaugural teams included Northern Kāhu, Whai, Tokomanawa Queens, Mainland Pouākai, and Southern Hoiho. The Queens were crowned the inaugural champions.

All five inaugural franchises continued for the league's second season in 2023.

Current teams

League championships

See also
 National Basketball League (New Zealand)
 New Zealand women's national basketball team

References

External links
 Official website
 Inaugural 2022 schedule
 Inaugural 2022 award winners
 "Northern Kāhu return to winning ways in Tauihi competition ahead of semifinals" at stuff.co.nz
 "Tauihi Basketball Aotearoa: Inside the creation of NZ's pro women's basketball league" at stuff.co.nz
 "Argentinean guard Florencia Chagas shines as Queens capture inaugural Tauihi crown" at stuff.co.nz
 Rapid League 2023

 
Women's basketball leagues in Oceania
Basketball leagues in New Zealand
Basketball
Women's basketball in New Zealand
2022 establishments in New Zealand
Sports leagues established in 2022
Professional sports leagues in New Zealand